Richard "Richie" $ Rich Jr. (often stylized as Ri¢hie Ri¢h) is a fictional character in the Harvey Comics universe. He debuted in Little Dot #1, cover-dated September 1953, and was created by Alfred Harvey and Warren Kremer. Dubbed "the poor little rich boy", Richie is the only child of fantastically wealthy parents and is the world's richest kid. He is so rich, his middle name is a dollar sign, $.

During Harvey Comics' heyday from 1950 to 1982, Richie was the publisher's most popular character, eventually starring in over 50 separate titles, including the long-running comics Richie Rich, Richie Rich Millions, Richie Rich Dollars and Cents, and Richie Rich Success Stories.

In 2011, Ape Entertainment began publishing a new licensed Richie Rich comic book series, taking the character in a very different, action-oriented, direction.

Publication history
Although created in 1953, Richie didn't have his own title until 1960. Once he did, however, he quickly became Harvey's most popular character, eventually starring in over fifty separate titles. The flagship, Richie Rich, ran 254 issues from 1960 to 1991 (with a hiatus from 1982 to 1986), followed by a second volume that ran an additional 28 issues from 1991 to 1994.

Other long-running titles were Richie Rich Millions (113 issues from 1961 to 1982), Richie Rich Dollars and Cents (109 issues from 1963 to 1982), and Richie Rich Success Stories (105 issues from 1964 to 1982).

In 1972, Harvey realized that Richie was its most lucrative character, and introduced five new Richie Rich titles: Richie Rich Bank Book, Richie Rich Diamonds, Richie Rich Jackpots, Richie Rich Money World and Richie Rich Riches. By the mid-1970s, says historian Mark Arnold, "Richie was starring in 32 different titles every 60 days... Certainly Richie was the most successful feature in American comic books in the 1970s."

Harvey ceased publishing in 1982, but started up again in 1986 under new ownership; this hiatus resulted in the cancelation of many titles. Richie (along with many of the Harvey characters) has been published only sporadically since 1994.

Writers for the Richie Rich comic books and syndicated comic strip included Sid Jacobson, Lennie Herman, Stan Kay, and Ralph Newman. Richie Rich's most famous illustrator is Warren Kremer. Other illustrators included Ernie Colón, Sid Couchey, Dom Sileo, Ben Brown, Steve Muffatti, and Joe Dennett.

Character
Despite any negative stereotypes associated with his incredible wealth, Richie Rich is portrayed as unfailingly kind and charitable (in fact, his moniker is "the poor little rich boy"). He lives in an expensive mansion and owns at least two of everything money can buy. Richie appears to be around seven to ten years old and wears a waistcoat, a white shirt with an Eton collar (which is obscured by a giant red bow tie), and blue shorts. He was occasionally shown attending school in his hometown of Harveyville. Other times he is classmates with Little Dot and Little Lotta in Bonnie Dell.

Ape Entertainment
For the Ape Entertainment comic book series debuting in 2011, the character was updated by emphasizing his altruistic side; "a mix of James Bond and Indiana Jones with the world's biggest bank account, Richie is an altruistic adventurer who travels the world helping the less fortunate!" The new Richie was joined by updated versions of his robot maid Irona and his butler Cadbury.

Supporting characters

Rich family
 Mr. Richard Rich Sr. – Richie's father who is an industrialist (first appearance Little Dot #3)
 Mrs. Regina Rich (née Van Dough) – Richie's mother (first appearance Little Dot #1)
 Aunt Noovo Rich (a pun on the French term nouveau riche) – Richie's wealthy but very eccentric aunt who is crazy about posting signs. She has a tendency to show off her wealth. While few of Richie's aunts and uncles are clarified to be paternal or maternal, Aunt Noovo is known to be his paternal aunt making her Mr. Rich's sister.
 Uncle Titus - Although just as wealthy as the rest of the family, Uncle Titus is fanatical about saving money. He typically wears the most threadbare of clothes and makes every conceivable effort to avoid spending money, to the extent that his house is equipped with an alarm that goes off if he carelessly leaves the house with "too much" money. Some in the family have nicknamed him "Tite-wad"(as in tightwad), a name he accepts with good humor.
 Aunt Mintley – Oft-bewildered aristocrat.
 Aunt Cleo – An animal lover.
 Uncle Worry – Richie's uncle and former coach of a professional football team known for its long losing streak.
 Uncle Stormy – Another of Richie's uncles whom Richie initially mistakes for an impostor named Blackie Bludsoe in one issue.
 Uncle Spender – Another uncle of Richie who squanders his money yet often realizes a profit on his extravagance.
 Aunt Gussie – A formerly overweight aunt who slimmed down and decided to keep her new figure.
 Aunt Surprise – A jovial aunt who brings Richie elaborate toys for Christmas and is imprisoned along with Richie, his parents, Cadbury, and Casper inside a magic lamp by the Meanie Genie.
 Ezekiel Rich – Richie's nineteenth century ancestor whom Richie and Gloria met when they went back in time. He was arrested by the British as an enemy of the crown, but Richie came up with a way to save him.
 Gabby – A cousin who talks incessantly and became a salesman only to discover it was not the best line of work for him.
 Dollar – The Rich family "Dollarmatian" dog (like a Dalmatian, but with dollar signs instead of spots).

Van Dough family
 Reginald "Reggie" Van Dough Jr. – Richie's mean, spoiled, maternal cousin, known for playing constant pranks on everyone, most notably Richie and his family, which causes his father to punish him. He treats his servants shabbily, often by calling them "peasant" which in turn causes them to call him "monster" as they swiftly correct themselves and call him Master (first appearance Little Dot #2).
 Reginald Van Dough Sr. – Mrs. Rich's brother and Reggie's father. He is often angered with Reggie's non-stop pranks and often punishes him for them (usually by spanking).
 Vanessa Van Dough – Mrs. Rich's sister-in-law and Reggie's mother. She is not as quick to punish Reggie for his pranks, but she doesn't tolerate Reggie's unabashed cruelty either.
 Penny Van Dough – Reggie's baby sister. She talks only in "baby talk." The curl on her head is shaped like a dollar sign.

Richie's friends
 Gloria Glad – Richie's red haired girlfriend, notorious for her regular refusal of the many luxurious gifts Richie offers, and for her disdain for the open display of money, diamonds and other forms of wealth in Richie's household, despite his efforts to conceal it from her. Regardless, she always wins his attention in comparison to Mayda Munny. (first appearance Little Dot #33) Gloria's last name, for the 1994 live-action movie, was changed to Pazinski.
 Mayda Munny – Mayda Munny (whose name is a play on the phrase "made of money") is Richie's snobby ravenette wannabe-girlfriend, who never wins his attention. Like the Riches and Van Doughs, her family is fabulously wealthy. Immensely jealous of Gloria, and often angry when her plans to snare Richie's attention backfire on her. Like Reggie, Mayda is snobbish and addresses those beneath her as "peasant".
 Freckles and Pee-Wee Friendly – Richie's poor but most-prized friends (first appearance Little Dot #2), whose blue-jeaned playtime attire sharply contrasts Richie's bow-tied formal suit. Despite his working-class background, Freckles doesn't object to Richie's wealth the way Gloria does, and at times even enjoys it. Pee-Wee plays along with all of Freckles' and Richie's activities without ever saying a word.
 Billy Bellhops – A redheaded boy who worked as a bellhop at his father's hotel. Premiered in "Richie Rich and Billy Bellhops" in 1977, but was short-lived. Created by Alfred Harvey's son Russel.
 Timmy Time – An extraterrestrial boy who time-travels to present-day Earth (landing on the Riches' private beach) from the year 2019 in search of tholarine, a substance he needs for spaceship fuel back in 2019. He appeared only in Richie Rich Meets Timmy Time #1 (September 1977). Timmy Time was created by Ernie Colón as Mark Time. Colón's frustration at Mark Time being renamed Timmy Time and presented as a Richie Rich spin-off, when the original agreement had been that the character would debut in his own series, led him to abandon the project.
 Traveler - Timmy Time's robot friend.
 Jackie Jokers – A stand-up comedian and a friend of Richie Rich.
 Jerry Jokers – Father of Jackie Jokers who often performs in comedy acts with his son.

Rich family employees
 Cadbury C. Cadbury – The Riches' butler who attends to the Rich estate. British born, Cadbury gives the image of propriety and service. When need demands, however, he becomes a tough, gun-toting man of action. He is also a master hypnotist, ventriloquist and wood-carver. The 1994 live-action movie gave him a modified (longer, but actually more credible) name: Herbert Arthur Runcible Cadbury. 
 Irona – The Riches' robot maid and Richie's bodyguard.
 Bascomb – The Riches' chauffeur.
 Chef Pierre – The Riches' chef extraordinaire.
 Mr. Cheepers – Mr. Rich's accountant.
 Mr. Woody – The incompetent Rich estate carpenter whose work falls apart with a light touch.
 Nurse Jenny – The Rich family nurse who was Richie's nanny when he was a baby.
 Professor Keenbean – A scientist who is the head of the Rich research and development department and Richie's personal tutor.
 Professor Mindblow – A worker at the research and development department.
 Professor Pianissimo – Richie's violin teacher for one lesson in one issue, who becomes the teacher of a promising self-taught child violinist named Louis whom Richie met in a music shop.
 Chadwick – The Riches' assistant butler.
 Minnie Mintz – One of the Riches' cooks.
 Captain Fuzzby – The captain of the Rich family's estate police.
 Marie – The Riches' French maid and Chef Pierre's girlfriend.
 Mr. Green – The Riches' gardener.
 Captain Alar – The pilot of the Riches' supersonic jet.

Villains
 Onion – A recurring villain with horrible onion-powered breath capable of knocking victims unconscious with a trademark "hashoo!"
 Dr. Robert Blemish – A recurring villain. He is an evil mad scientist and nemesis of Professor Keenbean.
 Dr. N-R-Gee – A recurring villain with the distinguishing feature of a huge red light bulb for a head, caused when scientist Phil Lament (a pun referring to a light bulb's "filament") suffered an electrical accident in his lab.
 Condor – A billionaire mastermind with his own terrorist army and the Rich Family's worst enemy. His only desire is to take over Mr. Rich's empire.

In other media

Animated TV series
 Beginning in 1980, Richie Rich appeared in his own Saturday morning cartoon show, simply called Richie Rich where Richie Rich was voiced by Sparky Marcus. The show aired on The Richie Rich/Scooby-Doo Show from 1980 to 1982 and The Pac-Man/Little Rascals/Richie Rich Show from 1982 to 1984. In the animated version, Richie and his pals are somewhat older, around 12 years old. In the cartoon, Richie wears a red sweater with the letter "R" in front. Gloria was voiced by Nancy Cartwright with the voice talents of Dick Beals as Reggie Van Dough, William Callaway as Professor Keanbean and Chef Pierre, Joan Gerber as Irona and Regina Rich, Christian Hoff as Freckles and Pee-Wee, Stanley Jones as Cadbury and Mr. Rich, and Frank Welker as Dollar. While Dr. Blemish (also voiced by Frank Welker) appeared in one episode, Richie also has a recurring enemy in the Collector (voiced by Robert Ridgely).
 In 1996, the second Richie Rich animated series, also called Richie Rich aired in non-network syndication, starring Katie Leigh as the voices of Richie Rich and Irona. The series ran for 13 episodes and portrayed Richie in his "classic" tuxedo outfit. The show also features the voice talents of Jeannie Elias as Freckles, Gloria Glad, Reggie Van Dough, and Pee-Wee, René Auberjonois as Richard Rich, Chef Pierre, and Professor Keanbean, Pat Fraley as Dollar, Martin Jarvis as Cadbury and Bascomb, and Susan Silo as Regina Rich.
 Richie Rich made some appearances in the Fox cartoon The Simpsons, in the episodes "Three Men and a Comic Book", "Behind the Laughter", "Simple Simpson", and "Double, Double, Boy in Trouble". 
 Richie Rich was parodied in the Adult Swim cartoon Robot Chicken, voiced by Seth Green. He was featured in a parody of the TV show MTV Cribs, where the character is portrayed as a playboy and a rapper and he shows his house in the same style as the MTV show.
 In 2019, Richie Rich made his first appearance as a guest character on Harvey Girls Forever!, a Netflix animated series based on Harvey Comics characters, voiced by Jack Quaid. He is a main character in season 3 which premiered later that year.

Live action TV series
Netflix debuted a 2015 half-hour comedy series titled Richie Rich with Jake Brennan starring as Richie Rich, along with Joshua Carlon, Jenna Ortega, Lauren Taylor, Kiff VandenHeuvel, and Brooke Wexler. However, the series is very different from the original and the rest of the original main characters were replaced, like Herbert Cadbury their butler and Professor Keenbean head of Rich's research and development, the only exception is Irona. Unlike the comic book version, Richie is not born wealthy and is a self-made trillionaire. Unlike the comics, in this series, Richie has a sister, instead of being an only child, and both of them are raised by a single parent, their father. The show was executive produced by Jeff Hodsden and Tim Pollack from The Suite Life of Zack & Cody and A.N.T. Farm. The show was produced by DreamWorks Animation.

Live-action films
 Richie Rich, a live action film adaptation, was released in 1994, with Macaulay Culkin as the titular character, Edward Herrmann as Richard Rich, Christine Ebersole as Regina Rich, Jonathan Hyde as Cadbury, Michael McShane as Professor Keanbean, John Larroquette as the evil Laurence Van Dough, and Frank Welker providing special vocal effects. It was produced by Silver Pictures Davis Entertainment and released by Warner Bros. under its Family Entertainment label.
 A live-action sequel titled Richie Rich's Christmas Wish followed in 1998. This film starred David Gallagher as the titular character, Martin Mull as Richard Rich, Lesley Ann Warren as Regina Rich, Keene Curtis as Cadbury, Don McLeod as Irona, Michelle Trachtenberg as Gloria, Eugene Levy as Professor Keanbean, and Jake Richardson as Reggie Van Dough.

Advertisements
In 2012, Richie Rich was shown in MetLife's "Everyone" commercial during Super Bowl XLVI.

Titles published
Published by Harvey Comics unless otherwise noted
 Richie Rich
 vol. 1 (Nov. 1960 – Jan. 1991)—254 issues
 vol. 2 (Mar. 1991 – Nov. 1994)—28 issues
 Richie Rich Adventure Digest
 Richie Rich and... (Oct. 1987 – May 1990)—11 issues; each issue had a different guest star whose name became a part of the title for that issue only
 Richie Rich and Billy Bellhops
 Richie Rich and Cadbury (Oct. 1977 – Jan. 1991)—29 issues
 Richie Rich and Casper (Aug. 1974 – Sept. 1982)—45 issues
 Richie Rich and Casper in 3-D
 Richie Rich and Dollar (Sept. 1977 – Aug. 1982)—24 issues
 Richie Rich and Little Dot
 Richie Rich and Gloria (Sept. 1977 – Sept. 1982)—25 issues
 Richie Rich and His Girlfriends (Apr. 1979 – Dec. 1982)—16 issues
 Richie Rich and Jackie Jokers (Nov. 1973 – Dec. 1982)—48 issues
 Richie Rich and New Kids on the Block
 Richie Rich and Professor Keenbean
 Richie Rich and Reggie
 Richie Rich and Timmy Time
 Richie Rich Bank Book (Oct. 1972 – Sept. 1982)—59 issues
 Richie Rich Best of the Years Digest
 Richie Rich Big Book
 Richie Rich Big Bucks
 Richie Rich Billions (Oct. 1974 – Oct. 1982)—48 issues
 Richie Rich Cash (Sept. 1974 – Aug. 1982)—47 issues
 Richie Rich Cash Money
 Richie Rich, Casper, and Wendy
 Richie Rich Diamonds (Aug. 1972 – Aug. 1982)—59 issues
 Richie Rich Digest (Oct. 1986 – Oct. 1994)—42 issues
 Richie Rich Digest Stories (Oct. 1977 – Oct. 1982)—17 issues
 Richie Rich Digest Winners (Dec. 1977 – Sept. 1982)—16 issues
 Richie Rich Dollars and Cents (Aug. 1963 – Aug. 1982)—109 issues
 Richie Rich Fortunes (Sept. 1971 – July 1982)—63 issues
 Richie Rich Gems (Sept. 1974 – Sept. 1982)—43 issues
 Richie Rich Giant Size
 Richie Rich Gold and Silver (Sept. 1975 – Oct. 1982)—42 issues
 Richie Rich Gold Nuggets Digest
 Richie Rich Holiday Digest
 Richie Rich Inventions (Oct. 1977 – Oct. 1982)—26 issues
 Richie Rich Jackpots (Oct. 1972 – Aug. 1982)—58 issues
 Richie Rich Million Dollar Digest
 Richie Rich Millions (Sept. 1961 – Oct. 1982)—113 issues
 Richie Rich Money World (Sept. 1972 – Sept. 1982)—59 issues
 Richie Rich Money World Digest
 Richie Rich Movie Adaptation
 Richie Rich Profits (Oct. 1974 – Sept. 1982)—47 issues
 Richie Rich Relics
 Richie Rich Riches (July 1972 – Aug. 1982)—59 issues
 Richie Rich Success Stories (Nov. 1964 – Sept. 1982)—105 issues
 Richie Rich Summer Bonanza
 Richie Rich Treasure Chest Digest
 Richie Rich Vacation Digest
 Richie Rich Vacation Digest Magazine
 Richie Rich Vacation Digest '93 Magazine
 Richie Rich Vaults of Mystery (Nov. 1974 – Sept. 1982)—47 issues
 Richie Rich Zillionz (Oct. 1976 – Sept. 1982)—33 issues
 SupeRichie

See also
 Lord Snooty (in The Beano UK Comics)
 Rollo (in Nancy)
 Royal Roy, (a Star Comics answer to Richie Rich)
 Wilbur Van Snobbe (in Little Lulu)

References

External links
 Richie Rich at Grand Comics Database

 
1960 comics debuts
American comics adapted into films
Animated human characters
Child characters in comics
Comics adapted into television series
Comics characters in television
Comics characters introduced in 1953
Comics spin-offs
DreamWorks Classics franchises
Fictional businesspeople
Harvey Comics series and characters
Harvey Comics titles
Humor comics